Gourdvine Creek is a  long 1st order tributary to Richardson Creek in Union County, North Carolina.

Variant names
According to the Geographic Names Information System, it has also been known historically as:
Gourd Wine Creek

Course
Gourdvine Creek rises in a pond about 1.5 miles southeast of Hamilton Crossroads, North Carolina and then flows north to join Richardson Creek about 2 miles southeast of New Salem.

Watershed
Gourdvine Creek drains  of area, receives about 48.1 in/year of precipitation, has a wetness index of 401.82, and is about 33% forested.

References

Rivers of North Carolina
Rivers of Union County, North Carolina